John Dwight Canaday (1945 – December 26, 2012) was an American serial killer, rapist, kidnapper, and veteran who raped and killed three young women in Seattle from December 1968 to January 1969. He was the first documented serial killer that was active primarily in the state of Washington. Canaday originally was sentenced to death for two murders, which was later commuted to two life sentences. He was given a third life sentence in 2004 after he confessed to a third murder. He died while incarcerated at Clallam Bay Prison in 2012.

Murders 
In the early hours of December 17, 1968, 16-year-old Sandra Bowman, a pregnant newlywed, informed her husband Thomas that she had fallen ill, and was going to be bedridden for the rest of the day. Hours later, when Thomas returned home from his job at a canning company, he discovered Sandra stabbed to death, with her hands bound behind her back.

A reward was put out for the killer, with Thomas Bowman initially cashing in some of his own money. Thomas was ruled out as a suspect based on part of an alibi, and sooner or later police had exhausted all leads. On January 4, 1969, 21-year-old Mary Annabelle Bjornson was preparing dinner for a friend at her apartment. At around 9.PM, her friend arrived at the apartment, and found the food still cooking with Bjornson nowhere to be found. On January 24, three weeks after Bjornson's disappearance, 20-year-old Lynne Carol Tuski also vanished. She was last seen walking to her car in northern Seattle.

Arrest and trial 
In March 1969, Seattle police focused their attention on John Dwight Canaday, a divorced Vietnam war veteran, who had been accused of raping two women. Once in custody, he agreed to lead investigators to the bodies of Bjornson and Tuski, which he had hid in a snowy covered patch. He admitted that on January 4, the day Bjornson was last seen, he knocked on her apartment door claiming he was having car trouble. Once outside he pulled out a knife and forced her into his vehicle and drove her to Seward Park, where he raped and strangled her to death. On January 24, the day Tuski went missing, Canaday admitted to abducting, raping and killing her.

Canaday was indicted on two counts of murder the following month, and pleaded not guilty by reason of insanity. In the end, a jury deliberated for only two hours to find Canaday guilty on all counts, on the basis of which days later he was sentenced to hang. In 1972, Canaday won a reprieve after the Supreme Court of the United States reviewed cases of capital punishment in over 30 states, including Canaday's, and he was resentenced to life imprisonment on both counts.

Further identification and death 
By 2002, the murder of Sandra Bowman had still yet to be solved. The Washington State Crime Lab agreed to examine the evidence from Bowman's murder and subsequent autopsy in hopes of finding new clues. Amy Jagmin, a forensic scientist, created a DNA profile from a sample of the perpetrator's semen. The profile was sent into a database of convicted felons, which matched with Canaday's DNA. Once confronted with the news, Canaday admitted that he had killed Bowman, receiving yet another life sentence in 2004.

At the time of Bowman's murder, Canaday was working as a pipeman's helper for the city water department. The identification was a record moment as, at the time, Bowman's murder was the oldest cold case solved in Washington. It also identified Canaday as Washington's first known serial killer. On December 26, 2012, Canaday was found unresponsive in his cell at Clallam Bay Prison. His death, according to the State's department of corrections, was from natural causes.

See also 
 List of serial killers in the United States

References

External links 
 THE STATE OF WASHINGTON v. JOHN DWIGHT CANADAY (1971)
 THE STATE OF WASHINGTON v. JOHN DWIGHT CANADAY (1973)

1945 births
1968 murders in the United States
1969 murders in the United States
2012 deaths
20th-century American criminals
American male criminals
American murderers of children
American people convicted of murder
American prisoners sentenced to life imprisonment
American rapists
American serial killers
Male serial killers
People convicted of murder by Washington (state)
Prisoners sentenced to death by Washington (state)
Prisoners sentenced to life imprisonment by Washington (state)
Serial killers who died in prison custody
Violence against women in the United States